Diego Alejandro Ordaz Álvarez (born 7 May 1984) is a Mexican former footballer who played as a defender. He last played for Chiapas F.C. in the Liga MX, and before that he was with Atlante, Chiapas and San Luis.

Before his time at Jaguares, Ordaz made over 180 appearances for C.F. Monterrey, having made his debut on 16 March 2003 against Club América.

References

External links
 

1984 births
Living people
Footballers from Guadalajara, Jalisco
C.F. Monterrey players
Chiapas F.C. footballers
Atlante F.C. footballers
San Luis F.C. players
Lobos BUAP footballers
Association football defenders
Liga MX players
Mexican footballers